George Hancock (16 January 1931 – 6 February 2010) was an  Australian rules footballer who played with Hawthorn in the Victorian Football League (VFL).

Notes

External links 

1931 births
2010 deaths
Australian rules footballers from Victoria (Australia)
Hawthorn Football Club players
Bairnsdale Football Club players